Clara Steinitz (16 April 1852 – 1931) was a German novelist, feuilletonist, and translator from English, French, Italian, and Norwegian.

She was born to Jewish parents Bernhard and Pauline Klausner in Kobylin, Prussia, and was educated at Halle-on-the-Saale. In 1873 she married Siegfried Heinrich Steinitz, editor of Die Deutsche Presse, with whom she moved to Berlin.

Among Steinitz's novels were Des Volkes Tochter (1878), Die Hässliche (1884), Ihr Beruf (1886), Im Priesterhause (1890), Ring der Nibelungen (1893), and Irrlicht (1895). She also translated several novels from foreign languages, including Bayard Taylor's Joseph and His Friend: A Story of Pennsylvania,  Octave Feuillet's Les amours de Philippe, Hjalmar Hjorth Boyesen's Gunnar: A Tale of Norse Life and Under the Glacier, and Edward Bellamy's Miss Ludington's Sister: A Romance of Immortality.

Publications
 
 
 
 
 
 
 
 
 Translated into English as

References
 

1852 births
1922 deaths
19th-century German novelists
20th-century German novelists
19th-century Prussian women
English–German translators
French–German translators
German women novelists
Italian–German translators
Jewish novelists
Jewish translators
Norwegian–German translators
People from the Province of Posen
20th-century German women